Green Level is a town in Alamance County, North Carolina, United States. It is part of the Burlington, North Carolina Metropolitan Statistical Area. As of the 2020 census, the population was 3,156.

Geography
Green Level is located at  (36.123481, -79.344480).

Demographics

2020 census

As of the 2020 United States census, there were 3,152 people, 781 households, and 489 families residing in the town.

2000 census
As of the census of 2000, there were 2,042 people, 741 households, and 555 families residing in the town. The population density was 1,452.8 people per square mile (559.2/km2). There were 823 housing units at an average density of 585.5 per square mile (225.4/km2). The racial makeup of the town was 14.69% White, 73.41% African American, 0.78% Native American, 0.64% Asian, 8.91% from other races, and 1.57% from two or more races. Hispanic or Latino of any race were 13.47% of the population.

There were 741 households, out of which 33.5% had children under the age of 18 living with them, 44.5% were married couples living together, 23.5% had a female householder with no husband present, and 25.1% were non-families. 21.2% of all households were made up of individuals, and 8.1% had someone living alone who was 65 years of age or older. The average household size was 2.76 and the average family size was 3.18.

In the town, the population was spread out, with 27.9% under the age of 18, 8.0% from 18 to 24, 31.0% from 25 to 44, 22.4% from 45 to 64, and 10.7% who were 65 years of age or older. The median age was 35 years. For every 100 females, there were 88.6 males. For every 100 females age 18 and over, there were 86.5 males.

The median income for a household in the town was $31,793, and the median income for a family was $34,242. Males had a median income of $23,143 versus $21,161 for females. The per capita income for the town was $12,403. About 10.3% of families and 11.9% of the population were below the poverty line, including 12.9% of those under age 18 and 21.4% of those age 65 or over.

References

External links
 

Towns in North Carolina
Towns in Alamance County, North Carolina